The Blue Range is a mountain range of the Canadian Rockies, located on the Continental Divide in Banff National Park, Canada. The range was so named on account of its blueish colour when viewed from afar. Mount Alcantara is the highest point in the range.

This range includes the following mountains and peaks:

Notes 

Mountain ranges of Alberta
Ranges of the Canadian Rockies
Mountains of Banff National Park